Nayyer Abbas (born 15 January 1990) is a Pakistani first-class cricketer who played for Khan Research Laboratories. He also played club cricket for Wollaton of the Nottinghamshire Premier League and Knypersley of the North Staffordshire and South Cheshire League where he was awarded the Cricket World Club Player of the Year award in 2011.

See also
 Abdul Ghaffar
 Aun Abbas

References

External links
 

1990 births
Living people
Pakistani cricketers
Khan Research Laboratories cricketers
State Bank of Pakistan cricketers
Sialkot cricketers
Sialkot Stallions cricketers
South Asian Games bronze medalists for Pakistan
South Asian Games medalists in cricket